Facundo Bagnis and Federico Delbonis were the defending champions, although they did not play together. Facundo Bagnis played alongside Diego Sebastián Schwartzman, while Federico Delbonis did not participate.

Facundo Bagnis and Diego Sebastián Schwartzman lost in the semifinals to Pablo Cuevas and Pere Riba.

Pablo Cuevas and Pere Riba won the title, defeating František Čermák and Michail Elgin in the final, 6–4, 6–3.

Seeds

Draw

Draw

References
 Main Draw

Seguros Bolivar Open Barranquilla - Doubles
2014 Doubles